Flight Officer John Lyle (1920 – 2019) was an American World War II pilot and a member of the famed group of World War II-era African-Americans known as the Tuskegee Airmen. Dickson flew 26 combat missions during WWII. He had a lifelong love of sailing and over the course of his life he owned seven different boats. He was nicknamed Captain Jack for his love of sailing.

Military service
Lyle graduated from Englewood High School on chicago's Southside and in 1943 joined the military. He did not want to be a foot soldier so he pursued flying. After graduating from the Tuskegee Institute as a Flight Officer he was assigned to the European theatre. He flew 26 combat missions over Italy, Austria and Germany. Lyle, named his plane “Natalie” after his first wife. During the war he shot down a German Messerschmitt.

Awards

Congressional Gold Medal 2007

Education
Tuskegee Institute 1944

Personal life
Lyle was born and raised on the Southside of Chicago. He graduated from Englewood High School and in 1943 joined the military. He did not want to be a foot soldier so he pursued flying. Lyle married Eunice and was a stepfather to her 3 children. After the war, he became a police officer with the Chicago Park District and also started a tree-trimming company. He had prostate cancer at the end of his life. His wife Eunice said that his dying wish was to sit and watch the waves of Lake Michigan at Jackson Park Harbor Yacht Club. Lyle was married four times and Eunice was his fourth wife.

See also
 Executive Order 9981
 List of Tuskegee Airmen
 Military history of African Americans

References

Notes

External links
Video of John Lyle
Tuskegee Airmen at Tuskegee University
 Tuskegee Airmen Archives at the University of California, Riverside Libraries.
 Tuskegee Airmen, Inc.
 Tuskegee Airmen National Historic Site (U.S. National Park Service) 
 Tuskegee Airmen National Museum
 Fly (2009 play about the 332d Fighter Group)
 Executive Order 9981
 List of African American Medal of Honor recipients
 Military history of African Americans

1920 births
2019 deaths
United States Army personnel of World War II
Tuskegee Airmen
Tuskegee University alumni
Military personnel from Tuskegee, Alabama
Military personnel from Illinois
Congressional Gold Medal recipients
Businesspeople from Chicago
World War II pilots
20th-century American businesspeople
21st-century African-American people